{{DISPLAYTITLE:Phi1 Hydrae}}

Phi1 Hydrae, Latinized from φ1 Hydrae, is a yellow-hued star in the constellation Hydra. Its apparent magnitude is 7.61, making it too faint to be seen with the naked eye. Based upon an annual parallax shift of 12.3 mas as seen from Earth, it is located about 266 light years from the Sun.  It forms a triangle with the brighter φ2 Hydrae and φ3 Hydrae, between μ Hydrae and ν Hydrae.

Phi1 Hydrae is an ordinary G-type main-sequence star, having a Sun-like stellar classification of G2 V and a photospheric temperature only slightly higher than the sun. However, the mass is 34% greater than the Sun, and it is radiating 4.4 times the Sun's luminosity. Phi1 Hydrae is moving further from the Sun with a radial velocity of +15.8 km/s.

References

G-type main-sequence stars
Hydra (constellation)
Hydrae, Phi1
Durchmusterung objects
Hydrae, 43
051604
091369